Guiseley and Rawdon is a ward in the metropolitan borough and Rawdon is a civil parish in the City of Leeds, West Yorkshire, England.  This list also contains the listed buildings in Otley and Yeadon ward.  The wards and parish contain 99 listed buildings that are recorded in the National Heritage List for England.  Of these, one is listed at Grade I, the highest of the three grades, three are at Grade II*, the middle grade, and the others are at Grade II, the lowest grade.  The wards and parish contain the towns of Guiseley and Yeadon, the villages of Rawdon and Hawksworth, and the surrounding area.  Most of the listed buildings are houses, cottages and associated structures, farmhouses and farm buildings.  The other listed buildings include churches and items in churchyards, a village cross, a school, a former hospital, a railway bridge, a railway tunnel portal and retaining walls, a former tram shed, a town hall, and a telephone kiosk.


Key

Buildings

References

Citations

Sources

 

Lists of listed buildings in West Yorkshire